The John Griffith Store Building is a historic commercial building at 103–113 E. Scranton Avenue in Lake Bluff, Illinois. Built in 1925–26 by businessman John Griffith, the building originally housed four storefronts and several second-floor apartments. Architect Stanley Anderson of the firm Anderson, Ticknor & Fox, who designed several of neighboring Lake Forest's major institutional buildings and many of its homes, designed the store in the Colonial Revival style. The store's size and brick construction allowed it to stand out from Lake Bluff's other commercial buildings, most of which were smaller wooden structures; the use of the then-popular Colonial Revival style further distinguished it from its older and more modest neighbors. The building's design includes wooden decorations and trim around the first-floor doors and windows, two oriel windows on the second floor, stone lintels atop the second floor's remaining windows, a stone cornice, and a brick parapet.

The building was added to the National Register of Historic Places on February 5, 2003.

References

National Register of Historic Places in Lake County, Illinois
Commercial buildings on the National Register of Historic Places in Illinois
Commercial buildings completed in 1926
Colonial Revival architecture in Illinois
Lake Bluff, Illinois